Gabdulla Amantay (born as Gabdulla Sahipgareevich Amantayev, 23 July 1907 – 10 October 1938), was a Bashkir poet, writer and playwright.

In 1937, he was arrested for his views on the protection of the people. He was rehabilitated posthumously, only in the 1990s.

Creation

His scientific works are devoted to the principles of the definition of national literature, problems in the study of Bashkir folklore and literary language.

Education 
 Husainiya madrassas
 Orenburg Bashkir Pedagogical College
 1928-1931 he studied at the Oriental Department of the Leningrad Institute of Philosophy and Linguistics

References

1907 births
1938 deaths
Soviet poets
Socialist realism writers
Bashkir poets
Soviet dramatists and playwrights
People from Krasnogvardeysky District, Orenburg Oblast
People from Buzuluksky Uyezd